The Yuen Long Plain, in the northwestern corner of the New Territories, is the largest alluvial plain in Hong Kong. It covers Yuen Long Town, Tin Shui Wai, Lau Fau Shan, Ping Shan, Shap Pat Heung, Hung Shui Kiu, San Tin, Lok Ma Chau, Pat Heung, Kam Tin, Nam Sang Wai, Mai Po, etc.

In the past it was mainly covered by marshes, fields and fish ponds. Yuen Long New Town and Tin Shui Wai New Town were built on the plain.

Plains of China
Landforms of Hong Kong
New Territories